Udmurt may refer to:

Udmurt people, people who speak the Udmurt language
Udmurt language, a Finno-Ugric language 
Udmurtia or the Udmurt Republic, a federal republic of Russia
Udmurt Autonomous Oblast, an autonomous oblast of the Soviet Union